Aillon-le-Jeune (Arpitan: Alyon-le-Joueno) is a commune in the Savoie department in the Auvergne-Rhône-Alpes region, Southeastern France. In 2019, it had a population of 433.

Demographics

See also
Communes of the Savoie department

References

Communes of Savoie